Heinrich Neuhaus (25 April 1886 - 12 May 1949) was an Estonian entrepreneur and politician. He was a member of Riiginõukogu.

He was born in Tallinn.

References

1886 births
1949 deaths
Members of the Riiginõukogu
Politicians from Tallinn